Kris Zimmerman Salter is an American voice and casting director in the animation and video game industry. Her major works include the Metal Gear Solid series. In the cartoons, she has directed episodes for Ben 10, The Real Adventures of Jonny Quest, Regular Show and Fish Hooks.

Biography
A theatre major, she started working at Hanna–Barbera as a talent coordinator for Wildfire in 1986.

She has also directed and cast the voices for a number of games, including Onimusha 3: Demon Siege, Legacy of Kain: Soul Reaver, Grandia II, La Pucelle, Sword of the Berserk: Guts' Rage and No More Heroes. In addition, she also directed and/or cast the voices for various TV animated series, such as Johnny Bravo, Cow and Chicken, The Real Adventures of Jonny Quest, The Grim Adventures of Billy & Mandy, and its spin-offs Evil Con Carne and Underfist: Halloween Bash, SWAT Kats: The Radical Squadron, Ben 10 and The Jetsons (for which she was a talent coordinator). She was also the casting director and recording director for Regular Show.

She was married to voice actor Patric Zimmerman (the voice of Revolver Ocelot) for nine years, until 1992/1993. They continue to work together.

Filmography

Animation roles
 The New Adventures of Captain Planet – Additional Voices
 Droopy, Master Detective – Additional Voices

Video game roles
 Killer7 – Punk Kid C
 Marvel: Ultimate Alliance – Additional Voices
 Metal Gear Solid 4: Guns of the Patriots – Body of Armor (Satisfied Customers), Enemy Soldiers, Warning Voice of Gekko
 Professor Layton and the Last Specter – Additional Voices
 Resident Evil 6 – Civilians
 Shadows of the Damned – Demons
 Soldier of Fortune II: Double Helix – Additional Voices
 Star Trek: Starfleet Command III – Additional Voices
 Star Trek: Voyager – Elite Force – Crewman, Imperial Officer
 The Wonderful 101 – Wonder-Black
 Travis Strikes Again: No More Heroes – Jeane
 X-Men Legends – Female Civilian

Documentary roles
 I Know That Voice – Herself

Production filmography

 A Pup Named Scooby-Doo – Talent Coordinator (Season 1), Casting Director (Season 2-4)
 Adventures from the Book of Virtues – Casting Director (Seasons 1-2)
 The Addams Family – Casting Director (Season 2)
 Ape Escape Academy – Voice Director
 Ape Escape: On the Loose – Voice Director
 Arc the Lad: Twilight of the Spirits – Voice Director
 Area 51 – Voice Director
 Bayonetta – Voice Director
 Bayonetta 2 – Voice Director
 Bayonetta 3 - Voice and Casting Director
 Ben 10 – Casting and Voice Director
 Bill & Ted's Excellent Adventures – Casting Director (Season 1)
 Billy & Mandy's Big Boogey Adventure – Casting Director and Recording Director
 Bionic Commando – Voice Director
 Bionicle: Mask of Light – Voice Director
 Blazing Dragons - VO Direction and Casting with Gordon Hunt
 Bruno the Kid – Voice Director
 Capitol Critters – Casting Director
 Casper's Haunted Christmas – Voice Director
 Cave Kids – Voice Director
 Close Enough – Casting Director & Recording Director
 Code Name: S.T.E.A.M. – Voice Director
 Cow and Chicken – Casting Director and Recording Director
 Curious George – Casting Director & Voice Director (seasons 10-) (70 episodes)
 Dark Cloud 2 – Voice Director
 Dead Rising – Voice Director
 Dinotrux – Voice Director
 Droopy, Master Detective – Casting Director
 Dumb and Dumber – Casting Director and Recording Director (Season 1)
 Eternal Darkness: Sanity's Requiem – Voice Director
 Evil Con Carne – Casting Director & Recording Director
 Fantastic Max – Talent Coordinator (Season 1), Casting Director (Season 2) 
 Fire Emblem Fates – Voice Director
 Fish Hooks – Dialogue Director
 Final Fight: Streetwise – Voice Director
 Foofur – Talent Coordinator
 G.I. Joe: Resolute – Voice Director
 God of War II – Voice Director
 God of War III – Voice Director
 God of War: Ascension – Voice Director
 God of War: Ghost of Sparta – Voice Director
 Grandia II – Voice Director
 Gravedale High – Casting Director
 Happy Halloween, Scooby-Doo! – Casting Director & Voice Director
 Heretic II - Voice Director
 I Am Weasel – Voice Director
 Infinity Train – Voice Director
 Injustice: Gods Among Us – Voice Director
 Killer7 – Voice Director
 La Pucelle: Tactics – Voice Director
 Lair – Voice Director
 Legacy of Kain: Blood Omen 2 – Voice Director
 Legacy of Kain: Defiance – Voice Director
 Legacy of Kain: Soul Reaver – Voice Director
 Legacy of Kain: Soul Reaver 2 – Voice Director
 Lost Planet: Extreme Condition – Voice Director
 Mad Max – Voice Director
 Marvel: Ultimate Alliance – Voice Director
 Marvel's Spider-Man – Voice Director
 Marvel's Spider-Man: Miles Morales – Voice Director
 Metal Gear Acid 2 – Voice Director
 Metal Gear Online – Voice Director
 Metal Gear Rising: Revengeance – Voice Director
 Metal Gear Solid 3: Snake Eater – Voice Director
 Metal Gear Solid 4: Guns of the Patriots – Voice Director
 Metal Gear Solid V: Ground Zeroes – Voice Director
 Metal Gear Solid V: The Phantom Pain – Voice Director
 Metal Gear Solid: Integral – Voice Director
 Metal Gear Solid: Peace Walker – Voice Director
 Metal Gear Solid: Portable Ops – Voice Director
 Metal Gear Solid: The Twin Snakes – Voice Director
 Midnight Patrol: Adventures in the Dream Zone – Casting Director
 Mortal Kombat: Defenders of the Realm – Voice Director
 No More Heroes – Voice Director
 No More Heroes 2: Desperate Struggle – Voice Director
 No More Heroes III – Voice Director
 Onimusha 3: Demon Siege – Voice Director
 P.N.03 – Voice Director
 Pac-Man and the Ghostly Adventures – Voice Directors
 Paddington Bear – Casting Director
 Popeye and Son – Talent Coordinator
 Pound Puppies – Talent Coordinator
 Ratchet & Clank: Rift Apart - Voice Director
 Regular Show – Casting Director & Recording Director
 Regular Show: The Movie – Casting Director & Recording Director
 Resident Evil: Revelations 2 – Voice Director
 Return to Castle Wolfenstein – Voice Director
 Revenant – Casting and Voice Director
 Rockin' with Judy Jetson – Talent Coordinator
 Rugrats – Voice Director
 Scooby-Doo and the Alien Invaders – Voice Director
 Scooby-Doo! and the Witch's Ghost – Voice Director
 Scooby-Doo on Zombie Island – Voice Director
 Secret Mountain Fort Awesome – Casting and Voice Director
 Shadows of the Damned – Casting and Voice Director
 SOCOM U.S. Navy SEALs: Fireteam Bravo 2 – Voice Director
 Soldier of Fortune II: Double Helix – Voice Director
 Sonic Boom – Casting Director
 Spider-Man – Voice Director (season one)
 Star Trek: Armada II – Voice Director
 Star Trek: Elite Force II – Voice Director
 Star Trek: Voyager – Elite Force – Voice Director
 Star Wars Jedi Knight: Jedi Academy – Voice Director
 SWAT Kats: The Radical Squadron – Casting Director and Recording Director
 Syphon Filter: The Omega Strain – Voice Director
 Tenchu 2: Birth of the Stealth Assassins – Voice Director
 Tenchu: Wrath of Heaven – Voice Director
 The Completely Mental Misadventures of Ed Grimley – Talent Coordinator
 The Cramp Twins – Casting and Voice Director
 The Flintstone Kids – Talent Coordinator
 The Grim Adventures of Billy & Mandy – Casting Director and Recording Director
 The Jetsons (1987) – Talent Coordinator (Season 3)
 The New Adventures of Captain Planet – Casting Director and Recording Director (Seasons 4-6)
 The New Yogi Bear Show – Talent Coordinator
 The Pirates of Dark Water – Casting Director
 The Real Adventures of Jonny Quest – Casting Director and Recording Director
 The Smurfs (1986-1989) – Talent Coordinator (Seasons 6-8) & Casting Director (season 9)
 The Wonderful 101 – Voice Director
 Tom & Jerry Kids – Casting Director
 Tomb Raider: Anniversary – Voice Director
 Tomb Raider: Legend – Voice Director
 Tomb Raider: Underworld – Voice Director
 Travis Strikes Again: No More Heroes – Voice Director
 Uncharted: Golden Abyss – Voice Director
 Underfist: Halloween Bash – Voice Director
 Vanquish – Casting and Voice Director
 Wildfire – Talent Coordinator
 X-Men Legends – Voice Director
 X-Men Legends II: Rise of Apocalypse – Voice Director
 Yo Yogi! – Casting Director
 Yogi the Easter Bear – Casting Director and Recording Director
 Yogi's Treasure Hunt'' – Talent Coordinator (Season 3)

References

External links
 
 
 Animation World Magazine: An Interview With Kris Zimmerman On Voice Directing & Timing (September 1999)
 JustinShenkarow.com – Interview with Incredible Director Kris Zimmerman
 The Kojima Productions Report Podcast Session 34: Voice-over Director Kris Zimmerman

Living people
Place of birth missing (living people)
American casting directors
Women casting directors
American voice directors
American video game actresses
American voice actresses
Hanna-Barbera people
21st-century American women
Year of birth missing (living people)